Longworth is an unincorporated community in Fisher County, Texas, United States.

Doyle Brunson, professional poker player, was born in Longworth.

Notes

Unincorporated communities in Fisher County, Texas
Unincorporated communities in Texas